A list of films produced by the Sandalwood (Kannada language film industry) based in Bangalore in the year 2007.

Released films

See also

Kannada films of 2008
Cinema of Karnataka

References

External links
 Kannada Movies of 2007 at the Internet Movie Database

2007
Lists of 2007 films by country or language
2007 films
2007 in Indian cinema